Coleophora nairica is a moth of the family Coleophoridae. It is found in Armenia.

The larvae feed on Malus, Pyrus and Prunus species. They feed on the leaves of their host plant.

References

nairica
Moths described in 1991
Moths of Asia